John Glass Johnstone (20 May 1857 – 2 October 1931) was an Australian politician.

He was born in Geelong to saddler John Johnstone and Margaret Nicol. The family moved to Colac in 1867 and Johnstone was apprenticed to his father as a saddler. He soon purchased a tannery, and on 8 June 1882 married Jane Thomson Wilson, with whom he had five children. In 1883 he established an auctioneering, stock and station agency, and from 1901 to 1902 he served on Colac Shire Council. In 1911 he was elected to the Victorian Legislative Assembly as the Liberal member for Polwarth. He served until his resignation in 1917. Johnstone died in Colac in 1931.

References

1857 births
1931 deaths
Nationalist Party of Australia members of the Parliament of Victoria
Members of the Victorian Legislative Assembly
Politicians from Geelong
Australian stock and station agents